The following is a list of rivers in the Marlborough Region. The list is arranged in alphabetical order with tributaries indented under their downstream parent's name.

 Awatere River
 Blairich River
 Cam River
 Castle River
 Dane River
 Kennet River
 Hodder River
 Shin River
 Jordon River
 McRae River
 Medway River
 Penk River
 Tone River
 Winterton River

 Blind (Otūwhero) River

 Flaxbourne River

 Graham River

 Kaituna River
 Okaramio River

 Ōpaoa River
 Fairhall River
 Omaka River
 Taylor River
 Branch River

 Te Hoiere / Pelorus River
 Rai River
 Brown River
 Opouri River
 Tunakino River
 Ronga River
 Rainy River
 Tinline River
 Wakamarina River

 Waiau Toa / Clarence River
 Acheron River
 Guide River
 Saxton River
 Servern River
 Alma River
 Yarra River
 Dillon River
 Gloster River
 Hossack River
 Tweed River

Waima River

 Wairau River
 Branch River
 Leatham River
 Goulter River
 Hamilton River
 Marchburn River
 Ōhinemahuta River
 Tuamarina River
 Waihopai River
 Avon River
 Teme River
 Tummil River
 Spray River
 Waikakaho River
 Wye River

Marlborough